The Continental Youth Championships (CYC) is an annual weekend tournament of Gaelic football, hurling, and camogie organized by the Gaelic Athletic Association.  It is contested by teams from the USA and Canada, and is a separate competition from the existing youth championships in the New York, Canadian, and NACB areas. It began in 2004, and its location rotates around various cities from year to year.  The age of players ranges from Under 8 to Under 18.

Hosts:
 2004 - New York GAA
 2005 - San Francisco GAA
 2006 - Boston GAA
 2007 - Chicago GAA
 2008 - Philadelphia GAA
 2009 - San Francisco GAA
 2010 - New York GAA
 2011 - Boston GAA
 2012 - Chicago GAA
 2013 - Philadelphia GAA
 2014 - New York GAA
 2015 - San Francisco GAA
 2016 - Chicago GAA
 2017 - Buffalo GAA
 2018 - Boston GAA
 2019 - Philadelphia GAA

Growth
The CYC has grown at a rapid rate since its inception.  In 2006 it consisted of over 200 games played in three days. In 2014, 640 games were played in the four days.  Reasons given for its popularity compared to the existing youth tournaments are:
 Scheduling games at a time when children are not at school and when it is convenient and economical for kids and parents to travel
 The whole weekend is focussed exclusively on the children rather than youth games being played alongside adult games that draw more attention
 The atmosphere is a lot different from events such as the NACB play-offs because of the focus on underage games

The popularity of the CYC led to a decline in the number of teams participating in the North American Youth playoffs that used to run alongside the NACB adult play-offs on the Labor Day weekend.  Teams from the US and Canada take part, and British teams used to compete before the British GAA formed their own competition.

Management
The CYC was developed by the GAA's Overseas Development Committee under Gene Duffy, and is managed directly from Croke Park by the CYC Steering Committee that consists of officials at Croke Park as well as members of the GAA in North America.  At local level, the event is planned by the CYC Hosting Committee whose membership changes from year to year as the tournament moves from city to city.

International Play
The tournament used to be highlighted by international games which took place before the rest of the tournament. This showcase highlighted the USGAA team (formerly the NACB team), the London All-Stars, and the New York All-Stars representing the NYGAA.

References

External links
 Continental Youth Championships official website
 GAA official website
 USGAA official website
 New York Board official website
 2005 CYC video

Gaelic football competitions in the United States
Hurling competitions in the United States
Hurling competitions in Canada
Gaelic football competitions in Canada